Wally Taylor (1864 – November 10, 1922), was an American professional baseball player and manager in the late 19th and early 20th centuries. Despite an extensive 17-year career in the minor leagues, many of them in Class A (the highest minor-league classification at the time), Taylor never played in a major-league game.

Taylor is most known for being part of the Milwaukee Brewers' rise to prominence during the 1890s. A Class A team at the time, Milwaukee signed Taylor and several other talented players, some of whom were recommended by Taylor.

Taylor's best season was arguably 1897, when he compiled a .318 batting average over 116 games for the Toronto Canucks. In 1899, Taylor became manager of the Toronto club. In 1900, Taylor became manager of the Syracuse Stars and from 1901 to 1902, the manager of the Utica Pentups, which played in the New York State League. He played professionally until 1905, his last season with the New Bedford Whalers, when he produced a mediocre batting average of .239.

References

Birmingham Ironmakers players
Peoria Canaries players
Joliet Giants players
1864 births
Baseball players from Kentucky
Milwaukee Brewers coaches
Cedar Rapids Canaries players
Ishpeming-Nagaunee Unions players
Birmingham Grays players
Toronto Canucks players
Montreal Royals players
Syracuse Stars (AA) players
Utica Pentups players
Newark Sailors players
Haverhill Hustlers players
New Bedford Whalers (baseball) players
Toronto Maple Leafs (International League) managers
1922 deaths
Sportspeople from Covington, Kentucky